The 1992 Orlando Predators season was the 2nd season for the franchise. They went 9–1 and lost ArenaBowl VI to the Detroit Drive.

Regular season

Schedule

Standings

z – clinched homefield advantage

y – clinched division title

x – clinched playoff spot

Playoffs

Roster

Awards

References

External links
1992 Orlando Predators at ArenaFan.com

Orlando Predators
Orlando Predators seasons
Orlando Predators
1990s in Orlando, Florida